"Independent Women Part I" is a song recorded by American group Destiny's Child for the soundtrack to the 2000 film adaptation of the television program Charlie's Angels. It was written and produced by production duo Poke & Tone, consisting of Samuel Barnes and Jean-Claude Olivier, along with Cory Rooney, and group member Beyoncé Knowles. The song was later included on the group's third studio album Survivor (2001). "Independent Women" was Destiny's Child's first single to feature vocals from group member Michelle Williams and the only single to feature Farrah Franklin, who was no longer in the group when the single was released.

Released as the soundtrack's lead single in August 2000, the song held the number-one spot on the US Billboard Hot 100 chart for eleven consecutive weeks from November 2000 to February 2001. Billboard likened the song's release strategy to being influenced by Janet Jackson's "Doesn't Really Matter", saying the group "began planting the seeds for the upcoming release" in a similar vein. Billboard ranked the song at number 77 on their list "100 Greatest Girl Group Songs of All Time".

Background
"Independent Women" was used as a lead single for both the Charlie's Angels soundtrack, and the group's third album, Survivor. It was revealed that Knowles' father and then-manager, Mathew, submitted the track to the Charlie's Angels soundtrack without her knowledge.

Composition
According to the sheet music published at Musicnotes.com, the song is written in F-sharp minor with a tempo of 96 beats per minute.

Critical reception
The song was nominated for Best Song Written for a Motion Picture, Television or Other Visual Media at the 2001 Grammy Awards.
It was also ranked at number 85 on the list of Britain's favorite 100 songs, published in May 2002. It was named the 18th most successful song of the 2000s, on the Billboard Hot 100 Songs of the Decade. It was also nominated for Worst Song at the 2000 Stinkers Bad Movie Awards.

Commercial performance
"Independent Women Part I" was a chart success in the United States, reaching number one on the Billboard Hot 100. The single held the top position in the following week, which was seen as buoyed by the strong box office performance of Charlie's Angels and the heavy rotation the song received. The song had massive radio airplay, spending nine weeks atop the Hot 100 Airplay chart, significantly contributing to the performance of the single on the main chart. Subsequently, the single spent eleven consecutive weeks on the Billboard Hot 100 top position. During its tenth week at the top spot, the music press had expected that the single would fall off the top position because of strong competition at retail; however, it sustained due to the high sales of the maxi CD released in December 2000. The song was in the 2000–2001 edition of the Guinness Book of World Records for longest-running number-one song by a female group. "Independent Women Part I" also topped the Hot R&B/Hip-Hop Songs chart for three weeks, becoming Destiny's Child fourth number-one single on the chart.

In the United Kingdom, "Independent Women Part I" debuted at number one on the UK Singles Chart the week of December 2, 2000. The British Phonographic Industry (BPI) has certified the single platinum for sales of over 600,000 copies. The song spent one week at the top and stayed within the top 40 for 11 weeks before dropping out on February 17, 2001. The song was the 25th best-selling single of 2000 in the country. The song also reached the number-one position in New Zealand.

Music video
The music video was shot in Los Angeles from August 27 to September 1, 2000, and directed by Francis Lawrence. Destiny's Child take part of a futuristic Charlie's Angels boot camp and sit in a classroom to watch footage of Charlie's Angels. They learn from them and try out the challenges in several steps: agility (dancing), altitude (skydiving), combat (martial arts fighting) and speed (motorbike). At the end, the women are greeted by the ever-mysterious "Charlie". The band also performs in a huge disco set in between the scenes.

The music video premiered on MTV's Making the Video and is featured on the DualDisc edition of the album #1's and on the DVD release of Charlie's Angels.

Track listings

US and Canadian maxi-CD single 
 "Independent Women" (Part I—album version) – 3:41
 "Independent Women" (Victor Calderone drum dub mix) – 5:30
 "Independent Women" (Victor Calderone club mix) – 9:36
 "Independent Women" (Maurice's Independent Man remix) – 7:30
 "8 Days of Christmas" – 3:29

US 12-inch single 
A1. "Independent Women Part I" (Maurice's Independent Man remix) – 7:30
A2. "Independent Women Part I" (album version) – 3:41
A3. "Independent Women Part I" (instrumental) – 3:41
B1. "Independent Women Part I" (Victor Calderone club mix) – 9:36
B2. "Independent Women Part I" (Victor Calderone drum dub mix) – 5:30

UK CD1 
 "Independent Women Part I" (album version) – 3:41
 "Independent Women Part I" (Victor Calderone radio mix) – 4:24
 "Independent Women Part I" (Maurice's radio mix) – 3:54

UK CD2 
 "Independent Women Part II" – 3:45
 "Say My Name" (Timbaland remix) – 5:01
 "So Good" – 3:14

UK cassette single 
 "Independent Women Part I" (album version) – 3:41
 "Independent Women Part II" – 3:45

European CD1 
 "Independent Women Part I" (album version) – 3:41
 "Independent Women Part I" (Victor Calderone radio mix) – 4:24

European CD2 
 "Independent Women Part I" (album version) – 3:41
 "Independent Women Part I" (Joe Smooth 200 Proof 2 Step mix) – 4:17
 "Independent Women Part I" (Maurice's radio mix) – 3:54
 "Independent Women Part I" (Victor Calderone club mix) – 9:36

Australian and New Zealand CD single 
 "Independent Women Part I" (album version)
 "Independent Women Part I" (Victor Calderone radio mix)
 "Independent Women Part I" (Maurice's radio mix)
 "Independent Women Part I" (Victor Calderone club mix)

Credits and personnel
Credits are adapted from the liner notes of Survivor.

 Samuel Barnes – writing, production
 Tom Coyne – mastering
 Troy Gonzalez – recording
 Cory Rooney – writing, production
 Beyoncé Knowles – co-production, vocals, writing
 Jean-Claude Olivier – writing, production
 Kelly Rowland – vocals
 Manelich Sotolongo – recording
 Rich Travali – mixing
 Michelle Williams – vocals
 Farrah Franklin – vocals

Charts

Weekly charts

Year-end charts

Decade-end charts

All-time charts

Certifications

Release history

See also
 List of Billboard Hot 100 number ones of 2000
 List of Billboard Hot 100 number ones of 2001
 List of number-one R&B singles of 2000 (U.S.)
 List of Billboard Hot Dance Music/Club Play number ones of 2000
 List of number-one singles from the 2000s (New Zealand)
 List of UK Singles Chart number ones of the 2000s
 List of UK R&B Singles Chart number ones of 2000

References

External links
 

2000 singles
2000 songs
Billboard Hot 100 number-one singles
Charlie's Angels (franchise)
Columbia Records singles
Destiny's Child songs
European Hot 100 Singles number-one singles
Music videos directed by Francis Lawrence
Number-one singles in New Zealand
Song recordings produced by Beyoncé
Songs with feminist themes
Songs written by Beyoncé
Songs written by Cory Rooney
Songs written by Jean-Claude Olivier
Songs written by Samuel Barnes (songwriter)
Songs written for films
UK Singles Chart number-one singles